Directorio Revolucionario Estudiantil (abbreviation: DRE; English: Student Revolutionary Directorate) was a Cuban student activist group which in opposition to Cuban dictator Fulgencio Batista from 1954 to 1957 played a role in the Cuban Revolution, which came to power in 1959. In 1960, the Directorio was relaunched in opposition to Fidel Castro and moved its base to the United States, where it soon developed links with the Central Intelligence Agency. In August 1962 it carried out an attack on a beachfront Havana hotel. As of 1963, it was the largest anti-Castro student group in Miami; it also had a chapter in New Orleans, where it had contact with Lee Harvey Oswald in mid-1963. Immediately after the 22 November 1963 assassination of John F. Kennedy, it launched a campaign asserting that Lee Harvey Oswald had been acting on behalf of the Cuban government. The group lost its CIA support in December 1966.

History
The DRE was founded in 1954 as a Catholic student group opposed to the Cuban dictator Fulgencio Batista, defining its principles as political liberty, economic independence, and social justice. For a student group, the DRE made military contributions to the Cuban Revolution by focusing on targeted plans. In 1957, the group coordinated an attack on Batista's Presidential Palace organised by DRE leader José Antonio Echeverría, who died the same day in a related incident, and the opening of a second front in the Escambray Mountains, which was taken over by Che Guevara. The death of Echeverría and other leaders led to the virtual collapse of the group, and its remaining membership largely joined the Escambray front under the leadership of the 26th of July Movement. After the death of Echevarría, the leadership passed to Faure Chomón and Rolando Cubela Secades in the urban underground and the Escambray Mountain insurrection, respectively.

In February 1960 a group of the newly reformed DRE at the University of Havana and now opposed to communism, publicly opposed the visit of Soviet diplomat Anastas Mikoyan, leading to their expulsion from the university. Later that year the group moved its headquarters to Miami. There the group developed connections with the Central Intelligence Agency. On August 24, 1962, the DRE carried out an attack in Cuba, with two speedboats firing approximately sixty 20-millimeter shells into the Havana suburb of Miramar, damaging a beachfront hotel, the Rosita Hornedo, which housed advisers sent to Cuba from the Soviet bloc. The attack had been planned by the CIA's station in Miami, though the U.S. State Department maintained the attempt was independent of U.S. government knowledge or support.

In mid-1962 the DRE passed on early reports of missiles being stationed in Cuba to its CIA connections, not long before the presence of missile was confirmed by U-2 photographs and the ensuing Cuban Missile Crisis of October 1962. Afterwards, the DRE claimed some missiles had been hidden in caves, a claim the CIA discredited. The group expressed disappointment that the missile crisis was resolved without the forceful ousting of Fidel Castro.

In mid-1963 the CIA financed the DRE with $25,000 per month, under a CIA program named AMSPELL run by George Joannides, the chief of the psychological warfare branch JM/WAVE station in Miami. The money went to Luis Fernandez Rocha, the DRE's leader in Miami, and supported the DRE's activities in a variety of cities, including New Orleans. Joannides also provided non-financial support, reviewing military plans and briefing the DRE leadership on managing press relations. Joannides worked with the group from December 1962 to April 1964; CIA monthly reports on the group from 1960 to 1966 have been declassified, except for this period.

In August 1963 the DRE had several significant contacts with Lee Harvey Oswald. Oswald had approached a member, Carlos Bringuier, and pretended to be sympathetic to the DRE's goals. When DRE members later saw him handing out pro-Castro leaflets, their confrontation became physical and resulted in Oswald's arrest. The Warren Commission interpreted these contacts as a successful attempt by Oswald to attract attention as a left-wing activist; Gerald Posner, on the other hand, believes the DRE's harassment of Oswald helped provoke the assassination. Later the same month, Oswald took part in a local radio debate with DRE members.

The day after the assassination of John F. Kennedy the DRE, defying orders from Joannides to await instructions, launched a public campaign asserting that Lee Harvey Oswald had been acting on behalf of the Cuban government. Members communicated their claims to Paul Bethel, a former CIA employee active in Cuban exile politics, and Clare Boothe Luce. On 23 November published a seven-page brief on Oswald as well as a special edition of the DRE's monthly bulletin, a four-page broadsheet which ran the headline "The Presumed Assassins" above photographs of Oswald and Fidel Castro. The group held a press conference where pressed their case using accurate information about Oswald as well as the claim, never documented, that he had lived in the Moscow home of the Soviet foreign minister for two months. DRE members later said that the aim was to create public pressure for a U.S. attack on Cuba.

The CIA began to cut back its support for the DRE at the end of 1962 and ended its support in December 1966 when it characterized the group as inactive. In the intervening years, the DRE members had supported the CIA with its publishing and radio programs and by sending delegates to international student conferences.

See also

 Havana Presidential Palace attack (1957)
 Humboldt 7 massacre
 Radiocentro CMQ Building
 Presidential Palace
 José Antonio Echeverría
 Faure Chomón
 Rolando Cubela Secades
 Eloy Gutiérrez Menoyo

Notes

Gallery

References

Cuba–United States relations
Cuban Revolution
Opposition to Fidel Castro